Duolog Technologies was an Irish-based company that developed electronic design automation tools that assist with the integration of complex System-on-Chip (SoC), ASIC and FPGA designs. In 2014, Duolog was acquired by ARM Holdings plc, a multinational semiconductor and software design company headquartered in Cambridge, United Kingdom.

Overview
Duolog was founded in 1999 and headquartered in Dublin, Ireland.  Duolog provided design services to semiconductor companies as well as developing Semiconductor Intellectual Property Cores (IP) for wireless technologies including IEEE 802.11 (Wi-Fi) and IEEE 802.15.4 Zigbee. Duolog also developed software tools to assist semiconductor design teams to integrate the various IP components that make up their systems. These tools were based on the IP-XACT industry standard. IP-XACT is an XML format that defines and describes electronic components and their associated designs. The IP-XACT standard was originally developed by the SPIRIT Consortium and later taken over by Accellera and the IEEE.

References

External links
Official Duolog website

Electronic design automation companies
Technology companies of Ireland
Companies based in Dublin (city)